"Platinum Megamix" is a song by British group Steps, released on 3 June 2022 as a non-album single and in promotion of their forthcoming compilation album, Platinum Collection, scheduled for release on 19 August 2022. The group appeared on BBC's The One Show on 1 June 2022 to announce the release of the album and the single.

Music video
The music video was released on 1 June 2022.

Live performances
On 4 June 2022, Steps performed the track (in a shorter form) live for the first time at the Big Jubilee Street Party, commemorating the Queen's seventieth year on the throne. Lee was absent from the performance due to illness.

Charts

References

Sony Music singles
Steps (group) songs
2022 songs
2022 singles